Rey Francis J. Guevarra (born November 24, 1986) is a Filipino professional basketball player who last played for the Phoenix Pulse Fuel Masters of the Philippine Basketball Association (PBA). Guevarra was selected by the Air21 Express third overall in the 2010 PBA draft. He is known for his great athleticism, and is one of the most athletic players in the PBA today, evidenced by him winning the PBA Slam Dunk Contest for three consecutive years, from 2014 (with Justin Melton) to 2016, then again from 2018–2019.

He also had a brief stint with the Smart Gilas national team under Serbian mentor Rajko Toroman.

College career
Guevarra played college for Colegio de San Juan de Letran where he teamed up with future PBA players RJ Jazul and Bryan Faundo. Together, they led the Knights to a Finals appearance in 2007 before losing to rival San Beda Red Lions. On 2009, Guevarra injured his knee after a bad fall after colliding with San Beda center Sudan Daniel, which prevented him from playing with the Smart Gilas in the PBA and prematurely ended his college career.

Professional career

Air21 Express
Guevarra was drafted by Air21 Express third overall in the 2010 PBA draft.

San Miguel Beermen / Petron Blaze Boosters
On March 2, 2011, Guevarra, along with Rabeh Al-Hussaini and Nonoy Baclao, the top three picks in the 2010 draft, was traded by Air21 to San Miguel Beermen for Danny Seigle, Dondon Hontiveros, Dorian Peña and Paul Artadi.

Powerade Tigers / GlobalPort Batang Pier
On April 20, 2012, him, Al-Hussaini and Lordy Tugade was traded by Petron Blaze (formerly San Miguel) to Powerade Tigers for Marcio Lassiter and Celino Cruz.

"The Fafa Dunk"
With 11 seconds left during the 3rd quarter of Powerade Tigers (currently NorthPort Batang Pier) game against the Alaska Aces, Guevarra went coast-to-coast for a facial slam dunk over Aces import Jason Forte. Minutes later, he trended nationwide on Twitter.

Meralco Bolts
Guevarra, along with Vic Manuel, Josh Vanlandingham, and a 2015 first round pick was traded by GlobalPort to the Meralco Bolts for Sol Mercado, Kelly Nabong, and Jaypee Belencion.In the 2014 PBA All-Star Week he won his first Slam Dunk Contest along with co-champion Justin Melton. Both of them had perfect scores in the final two rounds. He won two more Slam Dunk contests again in 2015 and 2016.

Mahindra Floodbuster/Kia Picanto 
On October 28, 2016, Guevarra was traded back to Globalport for Joseph Yeo after Meralco lost in the 2016 Governor's Cup Finals. A month later he was in the free agent pool, but picked up by the Mahindra Floodbusters for a one-year deal.

Phoenix Fuel Masters 
After failing to get a renewal with Kia, he signed a one-conference deal with the Phoenix Fuel Masters. In his time there, he won his 4th and 5th Slam Dunk titles in 2018 and 2019.

PBA career statistics

Correct as of October 19, 2016

Season-by-season averages

|-
| align=left | 
| align=left | Air21 / Petron
| 29 || 8.9 || .375 || 1.000 || .696 || 1.2 || .1 || .2 || .1 || 2.7
|-
| align=left | 
| align=left | Petron / Powerade
| 25 || 15.9 || .436 || .143 || .692 || 1.6 || .5 || .2 || .3 || 5.2
|-
| align=left | 
| align=left | GlobalPort / Meralco
| 31 || 13.0 || .422 || .241 || .718 || 1.3 || .5 || .3 || .1 || 5.0
|-
| align=left | 
| align=left | Meralco
| 28 || 8.4 || .387 || .188 || .800 || .9 || .3 || .2 || .1 || 2.3
|-
| align=left | 
| align=left | Meralco
| 16 || 9.5 || .283 || .150 || .800 || 1.3 || .4 || .1 || .1 || 2.6
|-
| align=left | 
| align=left | Meralco
| 10 || 3.6 || .231 || .222 || .833 || .7 || .3 || .0 || .0 || 1.3
|-
| align=left | 
| align=left | Mahindra
| 9 || 10.5 || .286 || .300 || .600 || 1.1 || .3 || .2 || .0 || 2.8
|-
| align=left | 
| align=left | Phoenix 
| 8 || 3.7 || .417 || .333 || .000 || 0.5 || .1 || .1 || .1 || 1.5
|-
| align=left | 
| align=left | Phoenix 
| 10 || 4.5 || .533 || .455 || .250 || 0.5 || .1 || .1 || .1 || 2.2
|-class=sortbottom
| align=center colspan=2 | Career
| 166 || 10.7 || .394 || .207 || .734 || 1.2 || .2 || .0 || .0 || 3.4

Personal life
Guevarra is married to Nisa Guevarra (nee de Cataluna). They married in 2014.

References

1986 births
Living people
Barako Bull Energy players
Basketball players from Metro Manila
FIBA 3x3 World Tour players
Filipino men's 3x3 basketball players
Terrafirma Dyip players
Maharlika Pilipinas Basketball League players
Filipino men's basketball players
Meralco Bolts players
Letran Knights basketball players
People from Parañaque
Philippines national 3x3 basketball team players
Phoenix Super LPG Fuel Masters players
Powerade Tigers players
San Miguel Beermen players
Shooting guards
Small forwards
Barako Bull Energy draft picks